Scinax duartei is a species of frog in the family Hylidae.
It is endemic to Brazil.
Its natural habitats are subtropical or tropical high-altitude grassland, rivers, intermittent rivers, intermittent freshwater marshes, and rocky areas.
It is threatened by habitat loss.

References

duartei
Endemic fauna of Brazil
Amphibians described in 1951
Taxonomy articles created by Polbot